(The) Way to a Man's Heart may refer to:

"The Way to a Man's Heart", a horror story by Marilyn "Mattie" Brahen in Tales from the Miskatonic University Library (2017)
"The Way to a Man's Heart", a fantasy story by Esther Friesner in Chicks in Chainmail (1995)
The Way to a Man's Heart, a 1989 novel by Debbie Macomber
"The Way to a Man's Heart", an episode of the TV series Gimme a Break
"Way to a Man's Heart", an episode of the TV series Letterkenny
The Settlement Cook Book, subtitled The Way to a Man's Heart, a cookbook by Lizzie Black Kander

See also
List of proverbial phrases